The Castle of Pelegrina (Spanish: Castillo de Pelegrina) is a castle located in Sigüenza, Spain. It was declared Bien de Interés Cultural in 1949.

References 

Buildings and structures in the Province of Guadalajara
Castles in Castilla–La Mancha
Bien de Interés Cultural landmarks in the Province of Guadalajara